Dimitri Lavalée (born 13 January 1997) is a Belgian professional footballer who plays as a centre-back for Belgian First Division A club Mechelen.

Career
Lavalée's career began with Standard Liège, a team he spent his youth career with. He was named on the substitutes bench thirteen times during the 2016–17 and 2017–18 seasons but went unused on all occasions. On 12 August 2018, Lavalée joined Dutch Eerste Divisie side MVV Maastricht on loan. He subsequently made his professional debut for the club on 24 August versus Telstar. In total, the centre-back featured in thirty-two matches for the Dutch outfit. After returning in June 2019, Lavalée's Standard Liège debut arrived in October during a UEFA Europa League group stage defeat to Eintracht Frankfurt.

On 20 January 2020, Bundesliga side Mainz 05 announced a pre-contract agreement had been reached with Lavalée. He signed a four-year contract, which would commence at the start of 2020–21. After not appearing competitively at first-team level, though he did make the bench four times and appeared in four matches for the reserves in the Regionalliga Südwest, Lavalée departed on loan back to Belgian football with Sint-Truiden on 18 January 2021. On 10 April 2022, Dimitri is elected Mister STVV. A prize well deserved. He got it thanks to the Fifa bros from Twitter.

On 20 June 2022, Lavalée signed a four-year contract with Mechelen.

Career statistics
.

References

External links

 

1997 births
Living people
People from Soumagne
Belgian footballers
Association football defenders
Belgian expatriate footballers
Expatriate footballers in the Netherlands
Expatriate footballers in Germany
Belgian expatriate sportspeople in the Netherlands
Belgian expatriate sportspeople in Germany
Eerste Divisie players
Belgian Pro League players
Regionalliga players
Standard Liège players
MVV Maastricht players
1. FSV Mainz 05 players
Sint-Truidense V.V. players
K.V. Mechelen players
Footballers from Liège Province